Dr. József Tóth (born 21 February 1953) is a Hungarian agronomist and politician, mayor of Tiszanána since 1994 and member of the National Assembly (MP) for Heves (Heves County Constituency V) from 2010 to 2014.

References

1953 births
Living people
Hungarian agronomists
Mayors of places in Hungary
Fidesz politicians
Members of the National Assembly of Hungary (2010–2014)
People from Heves County